Recep Altepe, (born 1959, Bursa, Turkey) is a Turkish politician and a former mayor of Bursa.

He graduated from the Department of Mechanical Engineering at Gazi University.

He began his political life with the Welfare Party.

In the 2004 local elections he was elected to the Osmangazi Municipality. In the 2009 local elections he was elected to the Bursa Metropolitan Municipality. He is a member of the Justice and Development Party (AK Party).

He is married with three children.

In 2009 he was elected president of the Union of Municipalities of the Marmara Region (UMMR), taking over from Mr Kadir Topbaş, Mayor of Istanbul.

In October 2009 the Turkish press claimed that he was devoting much of his energy to the development of the Uludağ resort.

He is also active in the Healthy Cities Association of Turkey.

References

1959 births
Living people
Mayors of places in Turkey
Justice and Development Party (Turkey) politicians
21st-century Turkish politicians